The Society of Mathematicians, Physicists and Astronomers of Slovenia (Slovene: Društvo matematikov, fizikov in astronomov Slovenije, DMFA) is the main Slovene society in the field of mathematics, physics and astronomy.

The Society is occupied with pedagogical activity and with the popularization of mathematics, recreational mathematics, physics, astronomy and with organizing competitions at all levels of education.

It takes care of publicistic and editorial activity, where we should mention its gazette Obzornik za matematiko in fiziko (A Review for Mathematics and Physics), a magazine for secondary schools Presek (A Section), literary collection Sigma and other literary editions.

The current president of the Society is Dragan Mihailovic (since 2017) and the vice-president is Nada Razpet.

The DMFA collaborates with the European Mathematical Society (EMS), the European Physical Society (EPS) and many other related societies around the world.

Honourable members 

The Society grants an honourable membership to a person or persons, which have contributed significantly to advance of mathematical and natural sciences in Slovenia, and to development of the Society.

External links 
 DMFA Slovenije
 Info at EPS

Mathematical societies
Non-profit organizations based in Slovenia